The Delhi Capitals  are a franchise cricket team that represents the city of Delhi in the Indian Premier League (IPL). Founded in 2008 as Delhi Daredevils (DD), the franchise is owned by the GMR Group and JSW Group. The team's home ground is Arun Jaitley Stadium which is in New Delhi.

Listing notation 
Team notation
 (200–3) indicates that a team scored 200 runs for three wickets and the innings was closed, either due to a successful run chase or if no playing time remained
 (200) indicates that a team scored 200 runs and was all out

Batting notation
 (100) indicates that a batsman scored 100 runs and was out
 (100*) indicates that a batsman scored 100 runs and was not out

Bowling notation
 (5–20) indicates that a bowler has captured 5 wickets while conceding 20 runs

Currently playing
  indicates a current cricketer

Start Date
 indicates the date the match starts

Team records

Team Performance

Team wins, losses and draws

Result records

Greatest win margin (by runs)

Greatest win margin (by balls remaining)

Greatest win margins (by wickets)

Narrowest win margin (by runs)

Narrowest win margin (by balls remaining)

Narrowest win margins (by wickets)

Tied Matches

Team scoring records

Highest Totals

Lowest Totals

Highest match aggregate

Lowest match aggregate

Individual Records (Batting)

Most runs

Highest individual score

Highest career average

Highest strike rates

Most half-centuries

Most centuries

Most Sixes

Most Fours

Highest strike rates in an inning

Most sixes in an inning

Most fours in an inning

Most runs in a series

Most ducks

Individual Records (Bowling)

Most career wickets

Best figures in an innings

Best career average

Best career economy rate

Best career strike rate

Most four-wickets (& over) hauls in an innings

Best economy rates in an inning

Best strike rates in an inning

Most runs conceded in a match

Most wickets in a series

Hat-trick

Individual Records (Wicket-keeping)

Most career dismissals

Most career catches

Most career stumpings

Most dismissals in an innings

Most dismissals in a series

Individual Records (Fielding)

Most career catches

Most catches in an innings

Most catches in a series

Individual Records (Other)

Most matches

Most matches as captain

Partnership Record

Highest partnerships by wicket

Highest partnerships by runs

References

External  Links
IPL team Delhi Capitals web page on official IPL T20 website - IPLT20.com
Official Site

Delhi Capitals
2008 establishments in Delhi
Lists of Indian cricket records and statistics
Stats
Indian Premier League lists